Qallwa (Quechua for a little branch, also for an instrument out of wood or bones which the weavers use to press the threads of the cloth, Hispanicized spelling Jallhua) is a  mountain in the Andes of Peru. It is located in the Arequipa Region, Castilla Province, Andagua District.

References

Mountains of Peru
Mountains of Arequipa Region